Pteronepelys, sometimes known as the winged stranger, is an extinct genus of flowering plant of uncertain affinities, which contains the one species, Pteronepelys wehrii. It is known from isolated fossil seeds found in middle Eocene sediments exposed in north central Oregon and Ypresian-age fossils found in Washington, US.

Distribution and paleoecology 
Pteronepelys wehrii has been identified from two locations in the Clarno Formation, the leaf layer in the Clarno nut beds, type locality for the species plus the White Cliffs. The beds are composed of silica and calcium carbonate cemented tuffaceous sandstones, siltstones, and conglomerates which preserve either a lake delta environment, or alternatively periodic floods and volcanic mudflows preserved with hot spring activity.

Five additional specimens were studied from a location in the Eocene Okanagan Highlands, an outcrop of the Ypresian Klondike Mountain Formation in Republic.  The formation preserves an upland lake system surrounded by a mixed conifer–broadleaf forest with nearby volcanism.  The pollen flora has notable elements of birch and golden larch, and distinct trace amounts of fir, spruce, cypress, and palm.  Wolfe and Tanai (1987) interpreted the forest climate to have been microthermal, having distinct seasonal temperature swings which dipped below freezing in the winters.  However, further study has shown the lake system was surrounded by a warm temperate ecosystem that likely had a mesic upper microthermal to lower mesothermal climate, in which winter temperatures rarely dropped low enough for snow, and which were seasonably equitable.

It was likely wind-dispersed seed, and possibly part of the canopy flora of the forests, however the affinities of Pteronepelys with other flowering plants were unknown at the time of description.

History and classification 
The Pteronepelys wehrii specimens were studied by paleobotanist Steven R. Manchester of the University of Florida.  He published his 1994 type description for P. wehrii in the Journal Palaeontographica Americana.  The genus and species were described from a series of type specimens, the holotype specimen OMSI PM018, which was preserved in the paleobotanical collections of the Oregon Museum of Science and Industry in Portland, Oregon, and seven paratype specimens. Of the paratypes, one is housed in the University of Florida collections, a second is in the OMSI collections, with the remaining five in the Burke Museum paleontology collections.

The genus name Pteronepelys is a combination of the Greek word elements Pteron meaning "wing" and epelys roughly translating to "stranger", while Manchester coined the specific epithet wehrii in honor of paleobotanist and artist Wesley Wehr, in recognition of contribution of the Klondike Mountain Formation specimens.  The genus has been occasionally given the vernacular name "winged stranger" as a result of the genus name.

Description 
Pteronepelys wehrii samaras are elongated and flattened sideways, with an elliptical wing that joins to an ovoid endocarp. In the middle of the nutlet tip are two central styles. The  wing has a convex lower margin and a convex to straight upper margin which meet at the basal end of the samara at a point where it would have connected to the parent plant. Three veins run the length of the wing, arising from the basal wingtip and merging onto the nutlet. Thick veins follow along the upper margin and cross the midline of the wing, while a third, thin vein curves parallel to the lower margin between the midvein and margin.

References

External links 
 

†
Plants described in 1994
Fossil taxa described in 1994
Eocene plants
Flora of the Northwestern United States
Extinct flora of North America
Eocene life of North America
Prehistoric angiosperm genera
Prehistoric plants of North America
Klondike Mountain Formation
Clarno Formation